is a Japanese manga artist.

Life 
Soryo was born in Beppu, Oita, Japan. She is a graduate of the Oita prefectural Geijutsu Midorigaoka High School. She was born into the home of a master of the Kanze school of Noh. In her childhood she liked to draw pictures of horses and things but had no special interest in manga.

While enrolled in fashion college, she happened across Shogakukan's Rookie of the Year Contest and applied to raise money for the Sōen fashion contest. There she received an honorable mention, and subsequently made her debut as a professional manga artist with "Hidamari no Hōmonsha" ("Sunspot Visito") published in the April 1982 edition of Bessatsu Shōjo Comic. For a couple of yours, she worked as an assistant for manga artist Fuyumi Ogura.

She made herself a name as a shōjo manga artist. In 1988, she was awarded the Shogakukan Manga Award for shōjo manga for Boyfriend. In 2001, she switched to mainly publishing seinen manga, working for the manga magazine Morning. Her manga series Cesare centers around the infamous Borgia family of the Italian Renaissance and Cesare Borgia himself.

Her works translated into English include Mars and ES (Eternal Sabbath).

Works

References

External links 
  
 

 
Women manga artists
Japanese female comics artists
Manga artists from Ōita Prefecture
1959 births
Living people
Female comics writers
20th-century Japanese writers
21st-century Japanese writers
20th-century Japanese women writers
21st-century Japanese women writers